Milton Horace West (June 30, 1888 – October 28, 1948) was a seven-term Democratic member of the United States House of Representatives representing Texas's 15th congressional district from 1933 until his death in 1948.

Early life
Milton Horace West was born on a farm near Gonzales, Texas on June 30, 1888. As a child he attended the local public schools in Gonzales County and later enrolled at West Texas Military Academy in San Antonio, Texas. After graduation West served with the Texas Rangers from 1911 to 1912. In 1915, after being admitted to the Texas state bar, he opened his first legal practice in Floresville, Texas.

Political career
From 1922 to 1925, West served as district attorney for Texas's 28th judicial district and later as assistant district attorney from 1927 to 1930. He won his first public office in 1930 when he was elected to the Texas House of Representatives where he served as a Democrat from 1930 to 1933. In 1933 West became a U.S. Representative when he was elected to replace John Nance Garner after his resignation (due to Garner being elected Vice President). He was later reelected to seven of his own terms in congress. He was reelected unopposed in 1942, 1944, and 1946 and did not stand for reelection in 1948. He died in office on October 28, 1948. He was a longtime resident of Brownsville, Texas where his body was buried in Buena Vista Cemetery. Future U.S. Senator and Secretary of the Treasury Lloyd Bentsen won the special election to fill West's vacant seat.

See also
List of United States Congress members who died in office (1900–49)
Texas's 15th congressional district
United States congressional delegations from Texas

References

External links

The Political Graveyard: Index to Politicians: West to Westbrook at politicalgraveyard.com

1888 births
1948 deaths
Democratic Party members of the Texas House of Representatives
Members of the Texas Ranger Division
County district attorneys in Texas
Democratic Party members of the United States House of Representatives from Texas
20th-century American politicians
People from Gonzales, Texas
TMI Episcopal alumni